Johnson Lake National Wildlife Refuge is located in the U.S. state of North Dakota. The Refuge was established by Executive Order 8122, signed on May 10, 1939 by President Franklin D. Roosevelt to be set aside as "a refuge and breeding grounds for migratory birds and other wildlife."

Johnson Lake National Wildlife Refuge is a part of the Arrowwood National Wildlife Refuge Complex, and is managed by the U.S. Fish and Wildlife Service. The refuge is privately owned under a conservation easement which allows the U.S. Government to enforce federal laws regarding refuge protection statutes. The refuge is not open to the public, but nearby roads permit some wildlife viewing from a distance.

More than a dozen species of ducks and wading birds have been documented. The most interesting waterfowl usually seen include the Canada geese, snow geese, tundra swans.

Mammals such as white-tailed deer are common, especially in the winter.

References

External links
 
 
 Oh Ranger: Johnson Lake National Wildlife Refuge

National Wildlife Refuges in North Dakota
Easement refuges in North Dakota
Protected areas of Eddy County, North Dakota
Protected areas of Nelson County, North Dakota